Sameh Zakout, ("Saz") is a Palestinian rapper from Ramla. His music features themes of Palestinian and Arab identity and calls for peaceful resolution of Arab–Israeli conflict. He was the subject of the documentary Saz: The Palestinian Rapper for Change.

References

External links
 Official Website
 Official Facebook Fan Page
 Christian Science Monitor, August 30, 2006
 Article at moreintelligentlife.com
 Article at EW.com
 Article at USA Today
 Article at Haaretz.com

Living people
Palestinian rappers
Year of birth missing (living people)
People from Ramla